Yiyang is a prefecture-level city on the Zi River in Hunan province, China, straddling Lake Dongting and bordering Hubei to the north. The previous census was in 2000 when it was recorded there were 4,309,143 inhabitants.

History
Yiyang county was founded in 221 BC after Qin conquest Chu state. It is designated Yiyang as the county seat was situated at the north bank of the Yi River (modern Zi River). Then the present-day jurisdiction mostly became a part of the Principality of Changsha commandery during the Western Han.

Subdivisions

Yiyang administers two districts, one county-level city, and three counties. The information here presented uses the metric system and data from 2010 national census.

Climate

Agriculture
Yiyang has many hilly farmlands in its vicinity. The primary crop around Yiyang is rice, with tea, and bamboo is also grown.

Government

The current CPC Party Secretary of Yiyang is Qu Hai and the current Mayor is Zhang Zhiheng.

Culture, People and Language
Huaguxi, the local Hunanese opera is very popular in Yiyang. The cuisine of Yiyang (a species of Xiang cuisine) is very famous for its spicy food made from pure Chili peppers.

Yiyang has many famous people in the modern time of China. Ho Feng-Shan is very famous in the history of Chinese foreign affairs since he had saved many Jewish families in Europe and China when he worked as a diplomat for China during World War II. Libo Zhou is a well-known writer in China, who was born in Yiyang.

The Language in Yiyang is "Yiyong-Wa" (Yiyang Dialect), which belongs to New Xiang dialect of the Chinese language. This dialect is very prevalent in all of Yiyang. But the western area of Anhua County of Yiyang has a slightly different accent, which is close to the Old Xiang accent of the Loudi District. Yiyang Dialect retains many ancient words and pronunciations and is influenced surprisingly little by Mandarin Chinese. Consequently, the Yiyang Dialect is very hard to understand for outsiders, although its speakers can communicate well with the speakers of other New Xiang dialects.

Religions
Historically, Buddhism and Taoism both played very important roles in the life of Yiyang people. In modern times, both of these religions experienced a decline, as in many other places in China. But nowadays, however, Buddhism and Christianity have many adherents in Yiyang, respectively 340,500 and 238,100 registered members.

Colleges and universities
 Hunan City University

International relations

Twin towns — Sister cities
Yiyang is twinned with:

  Namhae County, South Korea (2006)  
  Petah Tikva, Israel (2011)
  Stara Zagora, Bulgaria (1994.12.04)
  Guarulhos, Brazil (2019)

See also

References

External links
 Hntj.gov.cnprovides a brief overview of the city

 
Cities in Hunan
Prefecture-level divisions of Hunan